Mossoró is the second most populous city in the state of Rio Grande do Norte, Brazil, and also the largest municipality of that state.  It is equidistant (four hours' drive) from Natal (approximately 277 km or 172 miles), the state capital of Rio Grande do Norte, and from Fortaleza (approximately 260 km or 161.5 miles), the capital of the state of Ceará. It is also in the heart of Brazil's salt production area. Situated in the Oeste Potiguar mesoregion, Mossoró is the country's largest land-based petroleum producer.

History
To Brazilians, the main historical distinctions of the city are the driving off an attack by Lampião and his gang of "social bandits" (see Cangaço) that plundered entire towns in the sertão during the 1920s and 1930s; and also the fact that the city freed its slaves five years before the Lei Áurea abolished slavery in the rest of the country in 1888. Mossoró was also the first city to give women the right to vote in Brazil (Professor Celina Guimarães Viana cast the first vote in 1928), sparking a movement among other cities and states in Brazil that culminated in the official recognition of women's suffrage by the national government in 1934.

Geography

Climate
Mossoró is one of the hottest cities in all of Brazil. However, it is not uncommon for temperatures to exceed  throughout the year, with temperatures approaching  unexceptional. The sultriest temperatures are registered from October to January.

A fairly short wet season spans from January to May, while the scorching dry season spans the remainder of the year.

Demographics

(96th largest municipality in Brazil).

Culture and recreation

Although it does not have beaches within its city limits, there are several magnificent beaches in the surrounding area of the Costa Branca Pole such as the desert beaches of the city of Areia Branca. World-famous Canoa Quebrada beach is a short drive away in the neighboring state of Ceará.

The Resistance Museum tells the story of the city and the city's native sons. However, the most famous attraction is the Mossoró Cidade Junina (Mossoró Junina City Festival), a winter festival (festa junina) that attracts more than a million people during the month of June.

The city has a beautiful historic town, a hub of fascinating stories of the region's development. Main attractions include the Museu Municipal Jornalista Lauro da Escóssia (Journalist Lauro da Escóssia Municipal Museum), also known as the Cangaço Museum, the Station Arts old railway station museum, the Oil Museum, St. Vincent Church, and the Cathedral of Santa Luzia. Other attractions include the famous Palace of Resistance, former residence of mayor Rodolfo Fernandes who was the leader of the resistance against the "Lamp band" (Lampião) and served as a rampart against attacks from those notorious bandits. There is also the Bode Market, an ovine and caprine trading center where traders and buyers of sheep and goats continue the long-held rural traditions of the northeast, as well as the famous Central Market and the Railway Bridge.

In September, the city stages what could be the largest play in the world, the Auto Da Liberdade (The Procession of Liberty) with an all-paid cast of 2,000 and a 600-member chorus as part of its Festa da Liberdade (Brazilian independence celebrations).

Mossoró also has a shopping center, Mossoró West Shopping, which includes a 5-screen multiplex cinema, Wi-Fi internet connectivity, children's recreation and diaper changing area, ATMs, bowling alley, pharmacy, and food court among its many amenities.

Mossoró is also home to the Hotel Thermas Resort which is the largest thermal water park in Brazil. The heated water used in the resort arises from a zone of geothermal hot springs located in the vicinity of the city.
The city is the seat of the Roman Catholic Diocese of Mossoró.

Education

Colleges and Universities
The Federal University of the Semi-Arid is located in Mossoró.

The following have campuses in the city:
 Faculdade de Ciências e Tecnologia Mater Christi
 Faculdade de Enfermagem Nova Esperança de Mossoró - FACENE/RN
 Universidade do Estado do Rio Grande do Norte

Grade schools and high schools 
You can see a listing of public and private elementary, junior, and senior high schools in Mossoró HERE (In Portuguese.)
UNP universidade Potiguar

Regional transportation

Airports
Mossoró is served by the following airports:
 Mossoró Airport (Dix-Sept Rosado Airport) - 2.7 km away
 Aeroporto Internacional de Fortaleza (Pinto Martins International Airport) - 205.2 km away
  (Wikipedia page) - 245.8 km away (handed over to the Brazilian Air Force at the end of 2013, only for military use)
 Aeroporto Internacional da Grande Natal or Greater Natal International Airport (Opened to replace the old airport, the only airport that handles civil aviation in the area).

Highways
BR-304
BR-110
BR-405
BR-437

Distances to other Brazilian cities

 São Paulo:  
 Rio de Janeiro:  
 Brasília: 
 Salvador:  
 Belo Horizonte:  
 Curitiba: 
 Porto Alegre: 
 Manaus:

Images

See also

List of cities
List of major cities in Brazil
List of municipalities of Brazil
Municipalities of Rio Grande do Norte (RN)

References

External links

  Official Website
  Mossoró Cidade Junina Official Site
  LFG
  Federal University of the Semi-Arid
  De Fato Newspaper
  Thermas Resort

Municipalities in Rio Grande do Norte